Mitake can refer to

Companies:
Mitake Tozan Railway, a Japanese transport company in Ōme, Tokyo, Japan

Locations:
Mitake, Gifu, a town located in Kani District, Gifu Prefecture, Japan
Mitake, Nagano, a former village located in Kiso District, Nagano, Japan
Mitake-juku, the forty-ninth of the sixty-nine stations of the Nakasendō
Mount Mitake (Tokyo), a mountain in Tokyo, Japan
Mount Mitake (Hyōgo), a mountain located about 50 km (31 mi) north of Kobe in Hyōgo Prefecture, Japan

Transportation:
Mitake Station (Gifu), a train station on the Meitetsu Hiromi Line in Mitake, Gifu Prefecture, Japan
Mitake Station (Tokyo), a train station on the Ōme Line in Tokyo, Japan

Recreation 
Mitake rock climbing, a bouldering area near Mitake station, Tokyo, Japan

See also
2924 Mitake-mura, a main belt asteroid discovered in 1977 by Hiroki Kosai and Kiichiro Hurukawa
Grifola frondosa, also known as maitake, which is often misspelled mitake